Chaturbate is a pornographic website providing live webcam performances by individual webcam models and couples, typically featuring nudity and sexual activity ranging from striptease and erotic talk to more explicit sexual acts such as masturbation with sex toys. 

The site is divided into six categories: female cams, male cams, couple cams, transgender cams, private shows and spy shows. The gender-specific categories are free to watch but viewers have to pay to join a private show. Spy shows are private shows where viewers do not interact, and hence they are cheaper to view than private shows. As of April 2022, Chaturbate was the 57th most popular website in the world and the fifth most popular pornographic site.

Concept 
"Chaturbate" is a portmanteau of "chat" and "masturbate". Viewers are allowed to watch for free (with the exception of private shows), but pay money in the form of "tips" in order to see certain sex acts performed.

Models can synchronize remote-controlled vibrators and other sex toys so that they can be activated when "tipped" and the frequencies affected by the amount of "tips" given, with the intention of "users paying to try to give [the models] an orgasm". There are popular chat rooms, that can have more than 500,000 followers and can get up to 20,000 viewers at once. This is due in part to the "follow" button, which permits viewers to receive notifications when the model is broadcasting.

Another aspect of the site's inner workings is the use of "mods", short for "moderators", voluntary users who oversee that the broadcasts are compliant with Chaturbate policy, such as no violence or underage models.

Models need not be humans, as is the case with Projekt Melody, an artificial intelligence "cam girl", who has about 20,000 followers. However, Chaturbate did require the operator to prove their age.

The site itself earns revenues by taking roughly between 40% to 50% from the model's earnings. Chaturbate generates revenue from the audience when they purchase tokens using their credit cards.  Each Chaturbate token is worth $0.05 to a model and they need to earn at least $50.00 to receive the payment. However, when purchased by viewers, tokens cost about $0.10, depending on the amount bought in a single transaction.

Rankings 
As of November 2019, the site was ranked 22nd in the Alexa global rank and was the largest adult camming site competing with European BongaCams and LiveJasmin, which represented an increase from 167th globally and third in adult websites, trailing Xvideos and Livejasmin, in February 2017. In 2018, the top five countries that their users resided in were 20.5% from the United States, followed by 8.5% from Germany, 6.8% from Japan, 6.2% from the United Kingdom and 4.7% from China.

It is estimated that the site receives about 117 million monthly visits, which translates to approximately 4.1 million unique visitors each month, and an estimated 780,000 a day.

From its inception in 2011, till 2016, the site saw a 3,200% growth rate overall.

Sponsoring 
Chaturbate was the presenting sponsor for the 33rd AVN Awards in 2016, as well as an exhibitor at the AVN Adult Entertainment Expo that year and in 2017. In 2020, the site partnered with independent Canadian filmmakers Ethan Cole and Daniel AM Rosenberg to produce Cam_Girlfriend, a 10-episode web series broadcast on YouTube.

See also
Chat room
Internet pornography
List of chat websites
List of most popular websites
Porn 2.0

References

Sources

External links
 
Cam_Girlfriend (2020) on YouTube

Internet properties established in 2011
Adult camming websites
Video hosting
American erotica and pornography websites